Vivienne Christiana Gracia Plumb (born 4 April 1955) is New Zealand poet, playwright, fiction writer, and editor.

Biography
Plumb is of both New Zealand and Australian heritage. Born in Sydney, Australia, she received a Bachelor of Arts degree in English literature and a Master of Arts in creative writing from the International Institute of Modern Letters at Victoria University of Wellington, New Zealand.  She has earned a Doctor of Creative Arts (DCA) degree from the University of Wollongong, Australia. Her 2012 doctoral thesis, titled Hitchhiking: the travelling female body, was in two parts: a collection of short fiction, The Glove Box and Other Stories; and an accompanying exegesis.

Plumb originally trained in acting and performance at the Victorian College of the Arts, Melbourne. After being accepted into Bill Manhire's Original Composition course in 1990 at Victoria University of Wellington, she began writing. In 1993, Plumb and several other women playwrights (Lorae Parry, Fiona Samuel, Jean Betts, and Cathy Downes) formed WOPPA (Women's Professional Playwrights Association) and established The Women's Play Press.

She currently resides in Wellington, New Zealand.

Awards and residencies
Plumb has received numerous awards for her fiction, poetry, and drama.

1993 Bruce Mason Playwriting Award, Love Knots
1994 JD Stout Fellowship, Stout Research Centre, Victoria University of Wellington
1994 Best First Book, The Hubert Church Award for Prose, The Wife Who Spoke Japanese in Her Sleep
1998 First Place, New Zealand Poetry Society Annual Competition, The Tank
2000 Second place, New Zealand Listener National Poetry Competition, The Vegan Bar and Gaming Lounge
2001 Buddle Findlay Sargeson Fellowship
2004 Creative New Zealand, University of Iowa Writer's Residency, USA
2005 Varuna Retreat Fellowship, Australia
2005 Bronwyn Tate Memorial Award
2006 Writer-in-Residence, Massey University
2006 Writer-in-Residence, Hong Kong Baptist University
2009 Doctorate of Creative Arts scholarship, University of Wollongong
2012 Randell Cottage Creative New Zealand Writer-in-Residence
2014 Ursula Bethell Writer-in-Residence, University of Canterbury

Publications

Poetry
1998 Salamanca
2000 Avalanche
2004 Nearious, poems and parables
2005 Scarab
2006 Doppelganger (with Adam Wiedemann)
2007 From Darkness to Light
2010 Crumple
2011 The Cheese and Onion Sandwich and other New Zealand Icons

Plays
1994 Love Knots
2008 The Cape

Fiction
1993 The Wife Who Spoke Japanese In her Sleep 
1999 The Diary as a Positive in Female Adult Behaviour
2003 Secret City
2014 The Glove Box and other stories

Nonfiction
1991 Between These Hills (collected writing of the students of the 1990 creative writing course, Victoria University of Wellington)
1993 Sevensome (poetry collection by New Zealand women poets)
2003 Red Light Means Stop (six short solo theatre pieces by New Zealand women)
2013 Twenty New Zealand Playwrights

References

1955 births
Living people
20th-century New Zealand dramatists and playwrights
New Zealand women dramatists and playwrights
International Institute of Modern Letters alumni
International Writing Program alumni
20th-century New Zealand poets
20th-century New Zealand novelists
20th-century New Zealand women writers
21st-century New Zealand dramatists and playwrights
21st-century New Zealand poets
21st-century New Zealand novelists
21st-century New Zealand women writers
New Zealand women novelists
New Zealand women poets
New Zealand women short story writers
Writers from Sydney